A Story of the Nineties (Spanish:Historia del 900) is a 1949  Argentine musical film directed by Hugo del Carril and starring del Carril, Sabina Olmos and Santiago Arrieta. The film marked del Carril's directorial debut. Sets in the 1890s, It was one of a number of tango-influenced films produced in Argentina.

Cast
Hugo del Carril as Julián Acosta  
 Sabina Olmos as María Cristina  
 Santiago Arrieta as The Friend 
 Guillermo Battaglia as 'Pardo' Márquez 
 Angelina Pagano as The Mother  
 José Olarra 
 Sara Guasch as Rosa 
 Florindo Ferrario
 Paquita Garzón
 Ubaldo Martinez 
 Alberto Contreras 
 Leticia Scury 
 Vicente Álvarez
 Joaquín Petrocino 
 Franca Boni 
 Manuel Alcón 
 Lily del Carril 
 Ricardo Land

References

Bibliography
 Rist, Peter H. Historical Dictionary of South American Cinema. Rowman & Littlefield, 2014.

External links
 

1949 films
1940s historical musical films
Argentine historical musical films
1940s Spanish-language films
Argentine black-and-white films
Films directed by Hugo del Carril
Films set in the 1890s
1940s Argentine films